Roger Eddy may refer to:

 Roger Eddy (luger) (born 1946), Canadian former luger
 Roger L. Eddy (born 1958), member of the Illinois House of Representatives